Kalhorabad (also Romanized as Kalhorābād; also known as Kalhūrābād and Khalrāwa) is a village in Hoseynabad-e Shomali Rural District, Saral District, Divandarreh County, Kurdistan Province, Iran. At the 2006 census, its population was 370, in 76 families. The village is populated by Kurds.

References 

Towns and villages in Divandarreh County
Kurdish settlements in Kurdistan Province